The National Broadband Task Force was an initiative of the Government of Canada whose mandate was established in 2001 by the Canadian Minister of Industry, at that time Brian Tobin.

The Task Force was chaired by David Lloyd Johnston, and its report was delivered on June 18, 2001.

Mandate

The initiative sought "to map out a strategy for achieving the Government of Canada's goal of ensuring that broadband services are available to businesses and residents in every Canadian community by 2004."

Recommendations

The Task Force recommended four overall "priorities" for achieving basic broadband access by 2004:

 Transport Link: "All communities should be linked to national broadband networks via a high-speed, high-capacity and scalable transport link."
 First Nation, Inuit, Rural and Remote Communities: "The priority of the broadband deployment strategy should be to link all First Nation, Inuit, rural and remote communities to national broadband networks".
 Public institutions: "The local broadband access infrastructure should be extended to the community's public facilities, including every public learning institution, public health care facility, public library and other designated public access points."
 Connecting Businesses and Residences: "The local broadband access infrastructure should also be extended to local business and residential users, for example, by leveraging broadband infrastructure serving public facilities."

Membership

The membership of the National Broadband Task Force included web-linked members in Clarenville, Newfoundland and Labrador; Ottawa; Sioux Lookout, Ontario; and Iqaluit, Nunavut.

Chair

David Lloyd Johnston, president, University of Waterloo

Members

 Vic Allen, chief executive officer and vice-chair, Upper Canada Networks (UCNet)
 Louis Audet, president and chief executive officer, Cogeco Inc.
 Kathy Baldwin, superintendent, School District 14, 15 and 16, Miramichi, New Brunswick
 Brian Beaton, co-ordinator, K-Net Services, Keewaytinook Okimakanak in Sioux Lookout, Ontario
 Andrew Bjerring, president and chief executive officer, CANARIE Inc.
 Larry Boisvert, president and chief executive officer, Telesat Canada
 Pierre Bouchard, president and chief executive officer, RISQ Inc., Quebec Scientific Information Network
 Donald Ching, president and chief executive officer, SaskTel
 Hubert de Pesquidoux, president and chief executive officer, Alcatel Canada
 Denis Dionne, president, Montreal Technovision Inc.
 Darren Entwistle, president and chief executive officer, Telus
 Adamee Itorcheak, president, Nunanet Worldwide Communications
 John Kelly, principal, Reid Eddison Inc.
 Philippa Lawson, counsel, Public Interest Advocacy Centre
 William Linton, president and chief executive officer, Call-Net Enterprises Inc.
 Mary Macdonald, president, Macdonald and Associates Ltd.
 Michael MacMillan, chairman and chief executive officer, Alliance Atlantis Communications Inc.
 John McLennan, vice chairman and chief executive officer, AT&T Canada
 David Marshall, vice-chairman, Electronic Commerce, Technology and Operations, Canadian Imperial Bank of Commerce (CIBC)
 Gerry Miller, executive director, Information Services and Technology, University of Manitoba
 Wendy Newman, chief executive officer, Brantford Public Library
 Brendan Paddick, president, Regional Cablesystems Inc.
 Michael Sabia, president, BCE Inc. and vice chairman, Corporate, Bell Canada
 Jim Shaw, chief executive officer, Shaw Communications Inc.
 Gerri Sinclair, president and chief executive officer, NCompass Labs
 Charles Sirois, chairman and chief executive officer, Telesystem Ltd.
 Carol Stephenson, president and chief executive officer, Lucent Technologies Canada Corp.
 Allister Surette, president and chief executive officer, Collège de l'Acadie
 John Tory, president and chief executive officer, Rogers Cable Inc.
 Pamela Walsh, president, College of the North Atlantic
 Mamoru Watanabe, emeritus professor of medicine, University of Calgary
 John Wetmore, vice president, IBM.com, Americas
 Stephen Wetmore, president and chief executive officer, Aliant Inc.

Participating associations

 Canadian Association of Broadcasters
 Canadian Association of Internet Providers
 Canadian Cable Television Association
 Canadian School Board Association
 Canadian Wireless Telecommunications Association
 CATA Alliance
 Federation of Canadian Municipalities
 Information Technology Association of Canada

References

External links
 The National Broadband Task Force
 Report of the National Broadband Task Force (PDF)

2001 establishments in Canada
Canadian commissions and inquiries